is a Japanese film director and producer.

Career
He moved to the United States in 1990 and studied various aspects of filmmaking at Los Angeles City College, ranging from directing, and screenwriting to editing. After graduating from LACC, he returned to Japan and directed/produced a self-financed film, Two of Us, in 1995. He joined a film production firm and honed his skills as a producer. His commercial directorial debut was in 2001 with A Tale of a Desert Island (Mujintō Monogatari). He has since worked on a variety of projects as a director, producer, and screenwriter.

The movies Chiba directed include, Ganryu Island (Ganryūjima), Toho's 2003 period film starring Masahiro Motoki. In 2004 he directed Messiah (Meshia) and D.P. Chiba's expertise as a period action movie director is evident in The Rebel Ninjas (Tenshō Iga no Ran, 2005), The Rebel Ninjas, Abduction (Iga no Ran, Kōsoku, 2007), Warring Nations, The Rebel Ninjas (Sengoku Iga no Ran, 2009) and The Fugitive Ninja (Nukenin, 2009). His most recent films are the sci-fi action thriller Alien vs Ninja (2010) and The Kunoichi: Ninja Girl (2011).

Chiba established North CKY, Inc., his own production outfit, in December 2006 and has been the CEO of the company since its inception.

Filmography
 2003: Ganryu Island (Ganryūjima) 
 2004: Messiah (Meshia) 
 2004: D.P 
 2005: Grand Circle 
 2005: The Rebel Ninjas (Tenshō Iga no Ran) 
 2006: red letters
 2007: The Rebel Ninjas, Abduction (Iga no Ran, Kōsoku) 
 2009: Warring Nations, The Rebel Ninjas / Ninja Battle (Sengoku Iga no Ran) 
 2009: The Fugitive Ninja / Rogue Ninja (Nukenin) 
 2010: Ninja / Evil Ninja 
 2010: Alien vs Ninja 
 2011: The Kunoichi: Ninja Girl
 2012: I'm Coming to Get You (Ima, yari ni yukimasu)
 2014: Tokyo Legends I: Horror Of Human Hell (Tôkyô Densetsu: Kyôfu no Ningen Jigoku) 
 2014: Tokyo Legends II: Distorted City of Anomalies (Tôkyô Densetsu: Yuganda Ikei Toshi) 
 2016: Shûkatsu 
 2016: SUPER Horrifying Story ('Chô' kowai hanashi)
 2017: SUPER Horrifying Story 2 ('Chô' kowai hanashi 2)
 2018: Hidden Attack of the Dead (Kan-yû)

References

External links

Ganryu Island/Ganryujima(2003)
Messiah/ Meshia(2004)
D.P(2004)
red letters（2006）
The Rebel Ninjas, Abduction/Iga no Ran, Kosoku(2007)
Warring Nations, The Rebel Ninjas / Sengoku Iga no Ran(2009)
The Fugitive Ninja/Nuke Nin(2009)
Ninja / Evil Ninja(2010)
Alien vs Ninja(2010)
KUNOICHI / KUNOICHI〜Ninja Girl(2011)

1964 births
Living people
Japanese film producers
Japanese film directors
Japanese screenwriters
People from Yokohama
Los Angeles City College alumni